Ireen Maria Regine van den Assem (born 9 February 1990) is a Dutch field hockey player who plays as a defender for Den Bosch and the Dutch national team.

She participated at the 2018 Women's Hockey World Cup.

References

External links

1990 births
Living people
Dutch female field hockey players
Female field hockey defenders
HC Den Bosch players
20th-century Dutch women
20th-century Dutch people
21st-century Dutch women